Årset may refer to:

Årset, Ålesund, a village in the municipality of Ålesund in Møre og Romsdal county, Norway
Årset, Nærøy, a village in the municipality of Nærøy in Trondelag county, Norway 
Årset, Vartdal, a farming area in the municipality of Ørsta in Møre og Romsdal county, Norway

See also
Aarset